The Bioscience Resource Project is an advocacy organization focused on agriculture-related biosciences since 2006. In 2011, they started the Independent Science News website.

See also

Other organizations 
 Center for Food Safety
 Center for Science in the Public Interest
 Pesticide Action Network
 Physicians for Social Responsibility
 Union of Concerned Scientists

References

Public Interest Research Groups
Non-profit organizations based in New York (state)
Ithaca, New York